"Godwin" is a song by Nigerian songwriter and singer Korede Bello. It was released on 28 January 2015, by Mavin Records. The song features backup vocals from Don Jazzy.

Critical reception

Audio
"Godwin" was met with positive reviews from music critics. A writer for Jaguda.com rated it 3.5 out of 5 adding: "On first listen, one can’t help but enjoy the totally positive and hopeful message about it.....Overall it’s a good song, and most importantly, a song that’s very simple but still very powerful with its message." Chibuzor of 360Nobs commented on the song, saying, "This one is a feel good material by many standards, a song cutting across the various demographics and a potential hit given the needed plugging. The entire sounds and lyrical composition fuse in seamless beauty that oozes impeccability and style. God Win is full of cheeriness and drive; a cool number, indigenous, original, repeat-worthy and all."

Music video
The music video of "Godwin" was shot and directed by Adasa Cookey. Filmed in Lagos, Nigeria, it was uploaded to YouTube on 3 June 2015. The video amassed over one million views five weeks after its release. Moreover, it featured cameo appearances from Bovi, AY, Elenu, Yaw, Dr SID and Labi.

Live performance and criticism
On 5 April 2015, Korede Bello was invited to perform the song at a church. His invitation to perform the song at the church didn't sit well down some people, who felt he was a secular artist and shouldn't have performed on a sacred altar. He voiced his opinion on Instagram, saying,

Remix and covers
Clay, a female indie rock artiste from Nigeria did a cover version of "Godwin" in a rock style .

Awards and nominations

Personnel

Song credits
Writing – Korede Bello
Production – Don Jazzy
Video credits 
Director – Adasa Cookey

References

External links

Korede Bello songs
2015 songs
2015 singles
Song recordings produced by Don Jazzy